= Committee for Mammal Names =

The Committee for Mammal Names (Finnish: Nisäkäsnimistötoimikunta) is a working group which develops mammals names in the Finnish language.
